The Space & Upper Atmosphere Research Commission (SUPARCO) is the executive and national space agency of Pakistan. It is headquartered at the capital city of Islamabad in the northern part of Pakistan with additional facilities at the University of Punjab in Lahore.

Established in 1961 to assist development of space science and research in Pakistan, agency started to function only in 1964. It started to import and launch sounding rockets in the early 1960s and attained capability to fabricate rocket engines. However, the agency kept a low profile for the initial 30–35 years of its existence with limited progress in field of research and its progress in satellite technology also started relatively late.

Other Achievements

The country's first satellite, Badr-I, was built by the SUPARCO and launched from the Xichang Satellite Launch Center, China on July 16, 1990, which provided Pakistani scientists with valuable experience in telemetry and other satellite technologies.

SUPARCO played a significant role in development of Pakistan missiles. In early 80s, SUPARCO started to develop Hatf-I and Hatf-II missiles. M-11 missiles were imported from China for security needs and a factory too was developed for manufacturing missiles with help of China.  

In the meantime, the space programme suffered many setbacks, difficulties, and problems that partly slowed the progress of the space programme. SUPARCO imported and maintained small amount of rocket fuel for scientific research and announced in 1999 that it will introduce its own satellite and launch vehicles in three years. However, no further details on this program were ever revealed. The agency now has been pursuing Space programme 2040 since 2011 with only aim to launch more and more satellites from other countries only. SUPARCO has faced significant criticism within Pakistan for not being able to be up to its Indian and Chinese counterparts in terms of capabilities, both which countries have emerged as major space powers in recent decades.

History

Creation

The independent research in space sciences and aeronautical development was ensued and goaded by the senior physicists at the Department of Physics of the Punjab University, in 1957, following the successful launch of Soviet Union's first artificial satellite, the Sputnik 1 However, due to the political instability, the serious initiatives to establish the programme were not undertaken by the Government of Pakistan. Since 1958, Nobel Laureate Abdus Salam had played a major and influential role in the development of Pakistan's science policy.  Prof. Salam was accompanying President  Ayub Khan on an official visit to the United States on invitation of President John F. Kennedy.  US was then embarked on their Apollo program to beat the Soviets to the Moon.  NASA realising the gaping hole in upper atmospheric data invited countries bordering the Indian Ocean to join NASA in setting up rocket ranges and carrying out rocket-borne investigations of the Upper Atmosphere by establishing rocket ranges to obtain such data.  Prof. Salam invited Tariq Mustafa a senior engineer of PAEC who was then at the Atomic Energy Laboratories of USAEC at Oakridge Tennessee, to join him in meetings at NASA headquarters in Washington DC.  NASA invited Tariq to visit their Wallops Island rocket range in Virginia in order to draw up program and plans for establishing a rocket range in Pakistan.  Prof. Salam presented Tariqs report to President Ayub Khan for approval.

This led to the establishment of Pakistan's Space Program which was the first of its type in the Muslim world as well as the developing world. This led to the establishment of the Space and Upper Atmosphere Research Commission (denoted as SUPARCO) on 16 September 1961, with Abdus Salam being its first administrator and director. It was decided to set up a committee dealing with space sciences, consequently, a Space Sciences Research Wing at the Pakistan Atomic Energy Commission (PAEC). Within few weeks, the committee was established through the Presidential Executive Order (PEO) of President Ayub Khan which was addressed to co-chairman Ishrat Usmani, the Chairman of PAEC. The programme of rocket test firings was entrusted to the Chairman of PAEC.

1960s: Space flight programmes
One of the most earliest and notable achievements of SUPARCO activities was its unmanned space flight programme that was recorded on 7 June 1962. SUPARCO made research in the development of first solid-fuel expendable rockets, an assistance provided by the United States. On 7 June 1962, SUPARCO landed a record achievement when it launched first unmanned solid-fuel sounding rocket and took its first initial space flight from the Sonmiani Terminal Launch. The rocket was developed in a joint venture with Air force in a team led by PAF's Air Commodore (Brigadier-General) WJM Turowicz. Known as the Rehbar-I (lit. One who leads the way), Pakistan had secured its distinction as the third country in Asia and the tenth in the world to conduct successful spaceflight. The unmanned spaceflight mission continued under Turowicz, and according to SUPARCO, since 1962 until the partial termination of mission in 1972, ~200 sounding rockets took high success space flights from Sonmiani Terminal Launch. The National Aeronautics and Space Administration (NASA) publicly hailed the space flight programme as the beginning of "a programme of continuous cooperation in space research of mutual interest."

This cooperative agreement called for the training of Pakistan's scientists, engineers, and technicians at the specialized facilities in the United States. Before the June 1962 space flight programme, NASA had begun to train Pakistan's scientists at Wallops Island and the Goddard Space Flight Centres. NASA also set up fellowships and research associate programmes at various American universities for "advanced training and experience."

On 25 July 1964, Salam arranged another meeting with President Ayub Khan where SUPARCO was placed under the direct control of the President of Pakistan; it was followed by constitution of SUPARCO as an executive but separate authority under the administrative control of Salam on 8 March 1966. By the presidential decree, Salam was brought as its first and founding chairman and given the powers previously held by the PAEC Chairman.

Abdus Salam laid foundation of space infrastructure in Karachi and Lahore, particularly establishing infrastructure for physics research. With the establishment of SUPARCO, Pakistan was the first South Asian country to start a space programme. In 1967, Abdus Salam was succeeded by Air Commodore Władysław Turowicz, as he was made administrator of SUPARCO. Air Commdore Turowicz led the foundation of research activities and rocketry development in SUPARCO to the field of aeronautic sciences. The Doppler Radar Station (Islamabad Mission Control Center) was also established in the country as a part of a global network. In 1973, American Apollo 17 astronauts Eugene Cernan, Ronald Evans and Harrison Schmitt paid a state visit to Karachi amid great fanfare, to see the SUPARCO's headquarters.        During the early 1970s, the Islamabad Ionospheric Station within Quaid-e-Azam University was set up and the NASA Landsat ground station was established near Rawat.

1970s–1980s: Bureaucratization and reorganization
Entering in the late 1970s era, the space programme suffered many setbacks and experienced a number of difficulties, including lack of government response, shortage of technical personnel and expert engineers needed for the country to have an effective space programme. The space flight programme was abruptly ended due to lack of funds and lessening government response. It was during this time the militarization of the space programme took place by Prime minister Zulfikar Ali Bhutto when many senior combatant officers were appointed at the administrative position in the space programme. Many scientists involved in the programme were forcefully transferred to PAEC and KRL to aid the success of the atomic bomb project.

In 1981, reforms and re-organization of the space programme was carried out when Munir Ahmad Khan began to rebuild the space infrastructure, particularly in rocketry programme which would later form the basis of missile programme. On 13 December 1979, Munir Ahmad Khan arranged a meeting at bureaucratic level with President General Zia-ul-Haq where Khan persuaded the country's bureaucracy to put efforts to re-establish the space programme with an autonomous status without any political influence. Under taking the advice of Munir Khan, the space programme was again reorganized and appointed nuclear engineer dr. Salim Mehmud from PAEC as the chairman of SUPARCO. The bureaucratization of the SUPARCO took place in 1981 when the secretariat level committee, the Executive Committee of the Space Research Council was established with its members containing the officials from the finance, science, and economics ministries, chaired by the Finance minister of the country. The committee maintained its bureaucratic control over the space programme and had influence on wide range of policy measure programmes relating the space facilities and financial and scientific development of the rocketry programmes. In 1979-80s, SUPARCO launched the project to develop country's first artificial satellite and began sending hundreds of engineers to University of Surrey England to participate in the development of UO-11 which was launched in 1984. In 1983, a communication satellite project called Paksat was initiated, with the establishment of the 10-meter diameter satellite ground station for interception of satellite transmissions was set up that was mainly designed against India. According to the scientists involved in this programme, the real aim was to launch a satellite that could stage a "cultural counter attack" on India with the influx of new Pakistani media channels. But when Zia visited SUPARCO, all projects were cancelled and abruptly ended the satellite programme, citing the lack of funds. However, Munir Khan and others pressurized Zia to continue the development of the satellite despite Zia's unwillingness.

After participating in various projects with University of Surrey, the team of engineers returned to Pakistan in 1986. Munir Ahmad Khan then returned to General Zia-ul-Haq and obtained his approval to begin practical work on Badr-I. The project was started by SUPARCO's Dr. Salim Mehmud as director of the project and was supported by the members of Pakistan Amateur Radio Society. In short span of time, the Project Badr was completed, and the first satellite was named Badr-1. In 1990, Badr-I — Pakistan's first locally built satellite — was launched by the China National Space Administration (CNSA) of People's Republic of China (PRC).

1990s: Orbital slot crises and setbacks

In  the 1990s, the space programme experienced a number of orbital slot crises and failures, just like the one experienced in the Soviet space program. In 1991, SUPARCO launched another satellite project, Badr-B, with the technical assistance provided by the United Kingdom. The spacecraft's sub-systems were developed and manufactured by Pakistan-based DESTO, SIL and British Rutherford Laboratory,  while the spacecraft integration was performed by SUPARCO. The programme was completed in 1994, and it was expected to be launched the same year. However, the space programme began to suffer much more serious hindrances and lacked the technical assistance to launch the satellite on its own. The target to complete the satellite could not be achieved on time, and in 1994, plans to launch the spacecraft did not materialise, and the launch was halted and delayed long to 2001. Pakistan's space programme was now split between the competition with PAEC, NDC, DESTO, PAF Missile Command, and the KRL. Despite its success in its space flight programme in the 1960s, SUPARCO began to face intense competition from its rival organizations to build the space boosters. In the 1980s, SUPARCO largely took participation in building the first space booster, Hatf-I, but lost its credibility to KRL who derived the space vehicle into an operational missile. As early as in 1995, SUPARCI lost its major contract to NDC bureau to develop the country's first space booster, Shaheen-I. Although, SUPARCO contributed by building the solid-fuel engine of the rocket and its space launch pad was also used for the spaceflights, SUPARCO failed to gain the government's interest in its capabilities, and the control of the Shaheen expandable programme was handed over to NDC bureau as its executive authority.

In 1999, Abdul Qadeer Khan attempted to persuade President Pervez Musharraf but was unable to convince him to launch the satellite from Flight Test Center with Ghauri-I as its space booster. In 2001, after long negotiation with the Russian Federal Space Agency (RKA), the Badr-B took its first successful flight with Meteor-3M, from the Baikonur Cosmodrome, with Ukrainian Zenit-2 rocket as its boost launcher. Although the satellite was operated successfully, SUPARCO could not sustain the control of the satellite. The SUPARCO suffered a major setback and failure in its satellite programme when the satellite, two years after its launch, was lost in deep space and failed to reassure its orbital slots and reentry. According to sources within SUPARCO, the satellite was lost within two years, despite its designated life of five years, yet "no one in SUPARCO really knows what exactly happened to the satellite when contact was lost with it." Because of the surrounded secrecy and classified status, and for propaganda value, the details of the missions were covered up and buried deep; the government never fully investigated the incident.

In 1993, the Paksat programme was restarted but, unfortunately, terminated in 1994 after SUPARCO lost the two orbital slots 38°E longitude and 41°E longitude, which was acquired for it in the Geo-synchronous orbit. In 2002, SUPARCO again applied for the allocation of five GSo slots (38°E, 41°E, 30°E, 88°E and 101°E) and was filed. Although granted, SUPARCO faced the risk of losing its priority 38°E slot, if it did not launch its own satellite by April 2003. Being under pressure and understanding the substantial negative impact on the space programme, SUPARCO made a move to acquire an American satellite-building firm, Hughes Satellite Systems (HGS), at a cost of around $5 million. This second-hand satellite had been originally designed for Indonesia, but after a battery problem occurred making it useless during certain hours of the day, the firm solved the problem and sold the satellite to Pakistan as Paksat-1.

2000s–2010s: Recent developments and revitalisation
In 2000, SUPARCO was brought under the National Command Authority in order to focus on "real development", as its chairman maintained. Under the privileges and opportunities awarded by the economic liberalisation policies of Prime minister Shaukat Aziz, SUPARCO pushed herself to gain the support from local government and the private-sector.

In 2003, Pervez Musharraf and Shaukat Aziz began to forcefully push SUPARCO to pursue and deliver an active space programme. Funds and government support were increased personally by Pervez Musharraf as he goaded the space programme as "next logical frontier". In 2004, SUPARCO launched an ambitious project to develop the country's first Geo-stationary satellite; the new project was known as Paksat-1 Replacement. In 2007, Shaukat Aziz paid a state visit to Beijing where he successfully persuaded China to join the project, and to provide financial assistance to make the project successful.

In 2005, then-President Pervez Musharraf outlined his vision for SUPARCO by laying down a clearly defined agenda for the national space agency to pursue and deliver in minimum time. Musharraf had made it clear that:

In 2011, Paksat 1R  satellite was launched from China and was deployed successfully at 38°E in the Geo-stationary orbit. The new satellite took over the existing satellites of the country in orbit. Despite its initiatives to make the space programme more extended to private-sector, it was reportedly revealed by the chairman of SUPARCO in 2012 that "despite its initiatives and undertaking numerous development projects and joint ventures", but the efforts are seemingly wasted and work suffers from co-ordination failures at the local government level.

On 9 July 2018, China successfully launched two remote sensing satellites for Pakistan, which were launched to monitor progress as they build the China-Pakistan Economic Corridor. The satellites were named PRSS-1 and PakTES-1A, and were launched from the Jiuquan Satellite Launch Centre in northwest China using a Long March-2C rocket. The PRSS-1 is China's first optical remote sensing satellite sold to Pakistan. It is the 17th satellite developed by the China Academy of Space Technology for an overseas buyer, while PakTES-1A is an experimental satellite of Space and Upper Atmosphere Research Commission. It was indigenously designed and solely developed by SUPARCO, and is primarily aimed at remote sensing.

In March 2019, SUPARCO took part in the Global Space Congress for the first time held at Abu Dhabi, where they held an exhibition on their satellite-related projects.

Test facilities and space centers 

SUPARCO is headquartered near Port of Karachi in southern part of Pakistan and also has additional facilities in University of Punjab in Lahore. The headquarters of the SUPARCO are located in Karachi, Sindh Province near the Karachi University; while its administrative infrastructure is well developed and expanded all over the country. As early as the 1980s, SUPARCO joined the International Cospas-Sarsat Programme of Soviet Union and finally inaugurated the facility at the SUPARCO Headquarters. Known as "Pakistan Mission Control Center", the first commissioning test was carried out from 10 November 2009 at 0500Hrs.

The SUPARCO Plant located near Hub (a township of coastal Balochistan in Lasbela), the Paksat-1R ground Control Station (near PCSIR Laboratories) and FTR (Flight Testing Range) located in Sonmiani, also in Balochistan, near Karachi.

Main projects

Rehbar spaceflight programme

On 7 June 1962 at 19:53 hours (PKT), the Rehbar-I took its first successful spaceflight in deep space from the Sonmiani Terminal Launch. The rocket soared to about 130 km into the atmosphere, making Pakistan the third country in Asia and the 10th in the world to conduct such a launch. This was followed by the second booster, the Rehbar-II, which was also successfully launched from Sonmiani terminal launch on 9 June 1962. The data received from Rehbar-I and Rehbar-II gave scientists information on wind shear and structure of layers of the upper atmosphere extending beyond the stratosphere. The successful launch carried a payload of 80 pounds of sodium and it streaked up about 130 km into the atmosphere. SUPARCO tested its Rehbar rocket series for more than a decade. The space flight program was terminated on 8 April 1972.

Hatf Programme

The Hatf programme was developed with the contribution of the SUPARCO's scientists with collaboration from scientists of the KRL. The program was developed in extreme secrecy and was finally revealed in 1989 by the Pakistan Army. In January 1989, the rocket made its first maiden spaceflight which was dubbed by the army as "indigenous multistage rocket into deep space"; it was said to have reached an altitude of more than 480 km. According to experts, hatf missile program has derived from French Dauphin missile."

Shaheen-III

SUPARCO, which had participated earlier in the development of the Shaheen-I, began to take research on developing the first space-expandable vehicle in 1998. In March 2001, Science Advisor to President Abdul Qadeer Khan publicly announced that SUPARCO's scientists were in the process of building the country's first expendable launch vehicle, and that the contract has been awarded to SUPARCO rather than NDC.

Abdul Qadeer Khan also cited the motivation that "India had made rapid advances in launch technology" and satellite manufacturing as another motivation for developing indigenous launch capabilities. SUPARCO's previous chairman Dr. Abdul Majid confirmed Khan's statement and said "Pakistan envisions a low-cost satellite rocket-booster in order to launch light-weight satellites into low Earth orbits. Abdul Qadeer Khan closed his statement by adding that "Pakistan has very robust IRBMs which can launch geostationary orbiting satellites. All Pakistan has to do is to erase Delhi or Kolkata from the target and point it towards the sky. Instead of Hydrogen bombs and Atomic bombs, the missiles can easily carry a payload of a satellite". During the IDEAS 2002, journalists took pictures of the two possible and similar models of the satellite launch booster of SUPARCO.

It was widely speculated in 2002 by the international media that the country was deriving its missiles into an effective space booster,  as most likely "the second model might also be based on one of the ballistic missiles, operational with Pakistan Armed Forces.

On 18 August 2009, Samar Mubarak Mand reported that "Pakistan would launch its own satellite in April 2011 it made some things seem all too obvious to analyst familiar with the subject". According to Global Security.org, it was expected that the satellite would be launched from Shaheen-III booster from an unknown space facility within Pakistan. However, the satellite was launched by using the Long March 3B as its vehicle. Shaheen-III which was successfully tested on 9 March 2015 by Pakistan government turned out to be a medium-range ballistic missile. It may be possible in the future for SUPARCO to build lightweight satellites and deliver them using a Shaheen-III variant.

Future projects

Space Programme 2040 

The Space Programme 2040 is a satellite development and launch programme of SUPARCO. The Space Programme 2040 intends to replace the Badr satellite programme and geo-stationary communication satellite.

It includes the development of five GEO satellites and six LEO satellites to replace Suparco's existing satellites in the orbit. There are no plans for development of a Launch vehicle. Pakistan currently has no launch vehicles of its own and is not capable of launching and placing a satellite in orbit on its own. It entirely depends upon foreign vendors for launching satellites. The programme is entirely intended to launch more and more communication and remote sensing satellites from other countries. On 11 August 2011, Paksat-IR was launched from Xichang Satellite Launch Center by China, making it first satellite to be launched under this programme.

Satellite-control programmes
Since the early 1960s, when the second spaceflight of Rehbar-II weather rocket successfully took place to measure the upper atmosphere; the program gradually improved. In the 1980s, the Badr satellite program took place to counter the Rohini satellite, and was eventually launched by SUPARCO in 1990 in China. Since then, SUPARCO has an active satellite control program and controls various satellites, under the mutual agreement with the international community, from the Pakistan Mission Control Center (PMCC) located in SUPARCO headquarters.

Communication and geosynchronous satellites

Badr-1A

In 1986, SUPARCO took initiatives to locally build the country's first digital communication satellite, with the financial support from ministries of telecommunication and science. Initially, the government wanted SUPARCO to hold talks with NASA but after the Challenger disaster, the U.S Government halted all major spaceflights. Instead China voluntarily offered Pakistan to launch its satellite, using its Long March 2 rockets. In 1990, the satellite was immediately airlifted to China with SUPARCO personnel. In July 1990, the nation's first satellite was launched from China as, Badr-1, aboard a Long March 2E from Xichang Satellite Launch Center, China. The satellite successfully completed its designed life and it was termed by the government as a key success to SUPARCO.

PakSat-1Extended

The PakSat program was originally conceived in the 1980s but due to its first technical failure, the program was terminated in 1994. In 2003, SUPARCO held talks with Hughes Space and Communications Company to lease one of the Palapa satellites that it placed in ego-synchronous orbit for Indonesia. After Indonesia publicly declared that the satellite was unusable due to an electric power anomaly; the Hughes Space Company paid the insurance claims and sold the satellite to SUPARCO and renamed it as "PakSat-IE". The HGS-3 was then acquired by Pakistan from M/s Hughes Global Services on "Full Time Leasing " and relocated to Pakistan's reserved slot at 38°East. After a series of orbital maneuvers, the satellite was stabilized at the final location on 20 December 2002 with 0°inclination. The satellite is in position at the Pakistan-licensed orbital location, 38°east longitude. In 2012. The PakSat-IE was decommissioned later after the second satellite was launched in 2011.

PakSat-1Replacement

On 14 August 2011, PakSat-1R was launched by China using Long March 3B rocket. The 11,000 lb Satellite was built by China Academy of Space Technology on DFH-4 space platform; this satellite replaced PakSat-1E. The PakSat-1R is a program to support all conventional and modern Fixed Satellite Service (FSS) applications including broadband, E-learning, telemedicine, digital TV and emergency communications. The PakSat-1R satellite is programmed to control a total of up to 30 transponders: 18 in Ku-band and 12 in C-band. To ensure high degree of reliability and availability of the system, SUPARCO has two operational Mission control centers which were established in Karachi and Lahore, one to act as the Main control facility and the other as Backup respectively.

Weather and earth observation

Badr-B

In 1992, SUPARCO was given orders to develop its first LEO-based Earth observation satellite. According to the director of this program Dr. Abdul Majid, the satellite was to launch in June 1996 but the orbital crises delayed the launch of satellite and then it was launched on 10 December 2001 at 17:19 hours UT, Pakistan, from Baikonur Cosmodrome, Kazakhstan aboard a Russian Zenit-2 rocket.

Although, it was successfully put in orbit by SUPARCO in 2003, but according to internal sources in SUPARCO, the satellite ended up in a major disaster in mere two years after its launch despite its five-year designated life. The satellite was lost in deep space after it failed to reassure its orbital slot and failed to make its reentry in Earth's orbit.

Remote sensing satellites

In 2006–07, SUPARCO launched the development on high-resolution and the series of remote-sensing weather satellites to meet the national and international user requirements in the field of satellite imagery. This dual purpose remote-sensing and the weather satellite program is known as the PRS program, and in January 2007, a feasibility and system definition study was concluded by SUPARCO, which recommended the launch of an optical and Synthetic Aperture Radar (SAR) satellite to ensure that the domestic and international user requirements are competitively met. In July 2007, the development of the first prototype optical satellite in this PRS program was launched,  the manufacturing of the satellite was planned in the third quarter of year 2008. Initially, SUPARCO plans to launch an optical satellite with payload of 2.5-meter PAN in 700 km sun-synchronous orbit, which will be followed by a series of optical and SAR satellites in the future. The satellite is under development process by SUPARCO and it is expected to be launched in 2014.

On 9 July 2018, China successfully launched two remote sensing satellites for Pakistan, which were launched to monitor progress as they build the China-Pakistan Economic Corridor. The satellites were named PRSS-1 and PakTES-1A, and were launched from the Jiuquan Satellite Launch Centre in northwest China using a Long March-2C rocket. The PRSS-1 is China's first optical remote sensing satellite sold to Pakistan. It is the 17th satellite developed by the China Academy of Space Technology for an overseas buyer, while PakTES-1A is an experimental satellite of Space and Upper Atmosphere Research Commission. It was indigenously designed and solely developed by SUPARCO, and is primarily aimed at remote sensing.

Planetary sciences and scientific missions
Every year, SUPARCO sponsors and organizes the World Space Week (WSW) to promote the understanding of the Earth science all over the country. SUPARCO works with a number of universities and research institutions to engage in research in observational astronomy and astrophysics. The Institute of Space and Planetary Astrophysics (ISPA) of the Karachi University conducts key research and co-sponsors with international level research programs in astrophysics, with joint ventures of SUPARCO.

SUPARCO continuous development of the space program, with particular focus on indigenous, self-reliance and introduction of the state-of-the-art technologies, SUPARCO also offers its services to the private sector consortium to satisfy the industrial and environmental needs and to support economic competitiveness.

SUPARCO operates a national balloon launching facility in Karachi to conduct studies in atmospheric sciences to determine the vertical profile of ozone up to 30–35 km. This balloon sounding facility has been extensively used for carrying out research in better understanding of the meteorology and how the ozone layer vary seasonally  in the stratosphere and troposphere. The Ionospheric Station at Karachi operates a Lonosonde observation facility, and recently the balloon flight mission was carried out by the station on 16 January 2004, up to an altitude of about 36 km to measure the vertical profile of the O3 trends. The maximum O3 observed 12.65 mPa at 27 km. One of the most notable mission of SUPARCO is its Lunar program that conducts observational studies on the activity of Lunar phases and distributes its publications within the public domain.

Research facilities

Functions

Revitalisation and research program of SUPARCO 
In 2005, then-President Pervez Musharraf outlined his vision for SUPARCO by laying down a clearly defined agenda for the national space agency to pursue and deliver in minimum time. Musharraf had made it clear that:

In his book, In the Line of Fire: A Memoir, Musharraf has expressed his desire that "SUPARCO has suffered severe economic and global sanctions but in future Pakistan will send its satellites from its soil". Revitalization, restructuring, reorientation and modernization of SUPARCO are the main objectives outlined by President Musharraf. SUPARCO is to be brought at par with other strategic organizations around the world. Specific objectives include research and development of communication satellites, remote sensing satellites and satellite launch vehicles, with the objective of bringing rapid growth and socio-economic development in the fields of education, astronomy, cosmology, exobiology, stellar science, planetary science, planets, extrasolar planet, dwarf planets, comets, asteroids, astrophysics, astrobiology, astrochemistry, aerospace engineering, rocket propellent engineering, information technology, communications, agriculture sector, mineral excavation and atmospheric sciences.

 Development of state policy concepts in the sphere of research and peaceful uses of space, as well as in the interests of national security
 Organization and development of space activities in Pakistan and under its jurisdiction abroad
 Contributing to state national security and defence capability
 Organization and development of Pakistan's cooperation with other states and international space organizations

Astronomy and astrophysics program
The Astronomy and Astrophysics program (or SUPARCO Astrophysics program), is an active scientific mission of the Space Research Commission (SUPARCO), dedicated for the development of space science.  The program's mainstream objective and aim is to conduct research studies for the advancement and better understanding of the theoretical physics, astronomy, astrophysics, and mathematics involving the three-dimensional universal space and time.

Launched and established in January 2012, the program takes scientific and research studies pertaining to quantum mechanics, deep space objects, dark matter and energy, supernova, nebulae and galaxies mentioned in the Big bang theory. Under its new designated official space policy which was approved by the Prime minister of Pakistan Yousaf Raza Gillani, the programs inter-alia cohesively included the augmentation and strengthening of the understanding of physics and mathematics in the country, as part of the scientific mission of Suparco.

The program is promoted in the public circles through an academic bulletin which was launched on 2 January 2012 by Suparco.  The program is intended to provide initial and better understanding of space and astronomy and to create awareness among professionals, amateur astronomers, educators, students and public at large about the progress made in this field through technological innovations. The program was launched with the Space program 2040 (an official space policy of Government of Pakistan) after being approved by the Prime minister Yousaf Raza Gillani to enhance the separate astronomy and astrophysics programmes of SUPARCO, under one programme. This program is mainly focused on theoretical and observational research while collaborating with major space agencies in the world. The genesis of this program traced back to 2009 after Suparco publicly celebrated the International Year of Astronomy which was widely appreciated by the public.  Since then, Suparco managed and helds the World Space Week events and functions all over the country to educate the public circles in the notable areas of interest of astrophysics.

Currently, Suparco is planning to established its own version astronomical observatory, apart from the control of the universities and institutions, to conduct furthermore theoretical research in astrophysics and mathematics. On monthly basis, Suparco through its bulletin covers the research events and book reviews as well as work being carried out at SUPARCO under this program.

In January 2012, the program was launched its publishing its first publication in its bulletin. The first publication under this program included the research on upper atmosphere, software development relating the space technology, Lunar theory, Lunar eclipse Quadrantids and the asteroids. Since its establishment, a total of nine important publications has been released under the auspicious of this program with the last volume was issued in September 2012.

Other specific programs and missions

 Scientific space research
 Remote sensing of Earth
 Satellite telecommunication systems
 Geographic Information System
 Natural Resource Surveying
 Environmental monitoring
 Acquisition of data for atmospheric/meteorological studies
 Development of the ground-based infrastructure for navigation and special information system
 Space activities in the interests of national security and defence
 Development of research, test and production base of the space sector

Chairman of SUPARCO

International cooperation

People's Republic of China
In August 2006, People's Republic of China signed an agreement with Pakistan to conduct joint research in space technology and committed to work with Pakistan to launch three Earth-weather satellites over the next five years. In May 2007, China (as a strategic partner) publicly signed an agreement with Pakistan to enhance cooperation in the areas of space science and technology. The Pakistan-China bilateral cooperation in the space industry span a broad spectrum, including climate science, clean energy technologies, atmospheric and earth sciences, and marine sciences. On the occasion of Chinese launch of PakSat-1R, Pakistan's ambassador to China expressed the natural desire of Pakistan for China to send a first officially designated Pakistan astronaut to space aboard a Chinese spacecraft.

Turkey
In December 2006, Turkey showed interest to form a joint-venture with Asia-Pacific Space Cooperation Organization where Pakistan is a member. In 2006, Turkish minister of science, accompanied by the Turkish Ambassador to Pakistan, signed the Memorandum of understanding (MOU) with Pakistan to form a joint-venture with Pakistan in the development of satellite technology. The Scientific and Technological Research Council of Turkey and Turkish Aerospace Industries's senior ranking officials and representative signed a separate accord with the SUPARCO to enhance the cooperation in the satellite development program.

United Arab Emirates
In March 2019, SUPARCO took part in the Global Space Congress for the first time held at Abu Dhabi, where they held an exhibition on their satellite-related projects .

International collaboration and MoU
Invited by Soviet Union, Suparco joined the COSPAS-SARSAT program in 1990, after receiving the approval of the Government of Pakistan. Since 1990, Suparco has been controlling and hosting many Soviet-Russian COSPAS-SARSAT satellites. The Pakistan Mission Control Center in Karachi serves as headquarter of the region to control the Cospas satellites, and over the years Suparco has emerged as lead agency to provide ground and satellite transmissions to Cospas-Sarsat program. Pakistan is also a member of the Asia-Pacific Space Cooperation Organization (APSCO). SUPARCO and the Department of Space have signed formal Memorandum of Understanding agreements with a number of foreign political entities:

See also
 Chinese space program
 Indian Space Research Organisation
 List of government space agencies

Related
 Suparco's spaceflight missions and tests
 Suparco Space programme 2040
 Jinnah Antarctic Station

References

Sources

External links
 CNBC Pakistan televised Interview with Salim Mehmud – Chairman SUPARCO-Available in Urdu language
 Space and Upper Atmosphere Research Commission (SUPARCO)
 FAS report on SUPARCO
 Astronautix
 Shaheen- PSLV

 
Space agencies
Space organizations
 
Science and technology in Pakistan
Government agencies established in 1961
International research institutes
Research institutes in Pakistan
Pakistan federal departments and agencies
Space research
Science and technology in Karachi
1961 establishments in Pakistan
Space technology research institutes